John Alden Thorpe (born February 29, 1936 in Lewiston, Maine) is an American mathematician, known for contributions to the field of differential geometry.

Thorpe obtained his Bachelor's degree in 1958 from the Massachusetts Institute of Technology. His Ph.D. was done at Columbia University, under the direction of James Eells (Higher Order Sectional Curvature). From 1963 to 1965, he was  Moore Instructor at MIT and Assistant Professor at Haverford College in 1965. In 1967 and 1968 he was a visitor at the Institute for Advanced Study. From 1968, he was Associate Professor and then Professor at the State University of New York at Stony Brook (SUNY). From 1987 he was Professor and Dean at the State University of New York in Buffalo, and from 1993 at Queens College of City University of New York, where he also served as Provost. From 1984 to 1987 he served on the Board of Governors of the Mathematical Association of America. From 1998 to 2001 he was Executive Director of the National Council of Teachers of Mathematics.

He and Nigel Hitchin independently found an inequality between topological invariants, which provides a necessary condition for the existence of Einstein metrics on four-dimensional smooth compact manifolds. It is now known as the Hitchin-Thorpe inequality.

Books 
 Elementary Topics in Differential Geometry, Springer Verlag, Undergraduate Texts in Mathematics, 1979
 Lecture Notes on Elementary Topology and Geometry (with I.M. Singer), Springer Verlag, Undergraduate Texts in Mathematics, 1967

References 

1936 births
Living people
People from Lewiston, Maine
20th-century American mathematicians
Massachusetts Institute of Technology alumni
Columbia University College of Pharmacy alumni
University at Buffalo faculty
Stony Brook University faculty
Queens College, City University of New York faculty
21st-century American mathematicians